Madera Ranchos is a unincorporated community in Madera County, California, United States. As of the 2020 census it had a population of 3,623. For statistical purposes, the United States Census Bureau has defined Madera Ranchos as a census-designated place (CDP). Prior to 2020, Madera Ranchos was part of the Bonadelle Ranchos-Madera Ranchos CDP.

References

Census-designated places in California
Census-designated places in Madera County, California
Unincorporated communities in California
Unincorporated communities in Madera County, California